Hemachandran may refer to:

 Hemachandra (born 1988), Indian playback singer and music director
 Hemachandran (actor), Indian film actor
 J. Hemachandran (1932–2008), Indian politician and trade unionist